Tolulope Popoola is a Nigerian author who specializes in romance novels. Her writings and excerpts from her stories have been featured in several publications and magazines.

Career 
Popoola began writing in 2008, after resigning from her job with an accounting firm. She wrote her first book in 2009, but decided not to publish after discovering it was coincidentally overtly similar to In Dependence by Sarah Ladipo Manyika. In 2012, she published her first romance novel, Nothing Comes Close. The book was listed as one of the best books of 2012 by the Africa Writers Club.

Popoola is also the author of the novels Fertile Imagination and Looking for Something. She is the founder and editor of Accomplish Press, a publishing company she established mainly to accommodate "ethnic fiction" novels. In 2015, Popoola wrote a short fictional story, The Alibi, that was featured on Pulse. The story was on an unusual relationship between a maid and a housewife.

In 2017, Popoola was named one of ten Africans in Lancome's list of most powerful and diverse African women.

Recognition 
 2012 New venture award by Women in Publishing UK - 2nd runnerup
 2016 Special award of excellence by Nigeria Writers Awards
 2017 Diaspora writer of the year by Nigeria Writers Awards
 2017 100 Most influential Nigerian Writers under 40 (listed)

References 

Nigerian writers
Year of birth missing (living people)
Living people
21st-century Nigerian women writers
21st-century Nigerian novelists